Dakota Moon was an American band formed in Los Angeles, California, United States, in the mid-1990s. The band played a meld of pop rock, country and urban R&B; all four of the band members sang as well as played instruments. The group is composed of Ray Artis (bass guitar, vocals), Joe Dean (guitar, vocals), Malloy (percussion, vocals), and Ty Taylor (guitar, vocals). To date, they have released two studio albums for Elektra Records, and have charted three singles on the Billboard singles charts.

History
The four members of Dakota Moon met during a recording session in Los Angeles, and decided to form a full-time band because the session went well. After touring the L. A. club circuit, the band was signed with Elektra Records in 1997 by Elektra's CEO Sylvia Rhone, and was hired to open for Hall and Oates and Tina Turner later that same year. Dakota Moon released two albums for Elektra, in 1998 and 2002, and charted three hits in the US.

Discography
Dakota Moon (1998)
A Place to Land (2002)

Charting singles

References

Rock music groups from California
Musical groups from Los Angeles
Elektra Records artists